Events in the year 1901 in Brazil.

Incumbents

Federal government
President: Manuel Ferraz de Campos Sales
Vice President: Francisco de Assis Rosa e Silva

Governors 
 Alagoas: Euclides Vieira Malta
 Amazonas: Silvério José Néri
 Bahia: Severino Vieira
 Ceará: Pedro Augusto Borges
 Goiás:
 until June 10: Urbano Coelho de Gouveia
 June 10 - August 12: Bernardo Albernaz
 from August 12: José Xavier de Almeida
 Maranhão: João Gualberto Torreão da Costa
 Mato Grosso: Antônio Pedro Alves de Barros
 Minas Gerais: Silviano Brandão
 Pará: 
 until February 1: Pais de Carvalho
 from February 1:  Augusto Montenegro
 Paraíba: José Peregrino de Araújo
 Paraná: Francisco Xavier da Silva
 Pernambuco: Antônio Gonçalves Ferreira
 Piauí: Arlindo Francisco Nogueira
 Rio Grande do Norte: Alberto Maranhão
 Rio Grande do Sul: Antônio Augusto Borges de Medeiros
 Santa Catarina:
 São Paulo: 
 Sergipe:

Vice governors 
 Rio Grande do Norte:
 São Paulo:

Events
24 February - The Expointer agricultural show is launched in Porto Alegre.
5 June - The Correio da Manhã newspaper is published for the first time.
19 October - Aviator Alberto Santos-Dumont wins the Deutsch de la Meurthe prize with a flight that rounds the Eiffel Tower,

Births
22 April - Adhemar de Barros, politician (died 1969)
25 May - Antônio Castilho de Alcântara Machado, journalist, politician and writer (died 1935)
11 June - José Maria Alkmin, politician (died 1974)
August 1 - Pedro Aleixo, Vice President 1967-1969, de jure President Aug-Oct 1969 (died 1975)
9 September - Agostinho Fortes Filho, footballer (died 1966)

Deaths
13 March - Princess Januária of Brazil (born 1822) 
15 December - Elias Álvares Lobo, composer (born 1834)

References

 
1900s in Brazil
Years of the 20th century in Brazil
Brazil
Brazil